Sven Günther (born 22 February 1974 in Zwickau, East Germany) is a German former football player. He spent three seasons in the Bundesliga with 1. FC Nürnberg and Eintracht Frankfurt.

References

1974 births
Living people
People from Zwickau
German footballers
FSV Zwickau players
1. FC Nürnberg players
1. FC Schweinfurt 05 players
Eintracht Frankfurt players
FC Erzgebirge Aue players
FC Carl Zeiss Jena players
Bundesliga players
2. Bundesliga players
Association football midfielders
Footballers from Saxony